Elder Park is a public open space in the city of Adelaide, South Australia on the southern bank of the River Torrens and that is bordered by the Adelaide Festival Centre and North Terrace.

The park is named after the Elder family who were early settlers and developed the company Elder Smith (previously known as Goldsbrough Mort).

The Elder Park Rotunda was erected in 1882. The ironwork for the fountain was constructed at the Saracens foundry in Glasgow. The Popeye boat is launched off the banks of the River Torrens, near Elder Park as well as paddleboats. 
The Torrens Linear Park also passes through Elder Park.

It is the home of the annual Christmas Carols by Candlelight for Adelaide and also hosts Symphony under the Stars and the Adelaide Festival of Arts.

Another Elder Park exists in the Govan area of Glasgow, Scotland; this urban park was gifted to the community by the wealthy philanthropist widow Isabella Elder and named in memory of her late husband John, a successful shipbuilder.

References
List of Adelaide parks and gardens

References

Parks in Adelaide